Amorimia is a genus in the Malpighiaceae, a family of about 75 genera of flowering plants in the order Malpighiales. Amorimia comprises ten species of woody vines native to South America.

References

External links 

Malpighiaceae Malpighiaceae - description, taxonomy, phylogeny, and nomenclature
Amorimia

Malpighiaceae
Malpighiaceae genera